Littleover Community School is a coeducational secondary school situated on Pastures Hill, Littleover, Derbyshire in England, with pupils aged 11–18.

It is a co-educational non-denominational school which educates over 1,550 pupils from in and around Derby. It has previously held Science Mathematics and Languages specialist school status, and has good academic results, both at GCSE and A-Level. The current headteacher is Jon Wilding.

The school has its own Sixth Form Centre which was originally The Millennium Centre, a joint Sixth Form Centre with Derby Moor Community Sports College which opened in 1999, but disbanded in 2013 after Littleover’s Sixth Form became independent from Derby Moor and is now known as Littleover Community School Sixth Form Centre.

The new humanities block opened in October 2014. The school is located on Pastures Hill which follows the route of the Roman Icknield Street, and a short distance away from the school there are buried remains of this highway.

Notable alumni
 Des Coleman, news and weather reporter for East Midlands Today and The One Show
 Antonia Hodgson, historical novelist
 Karen Martin, Javelin silver medallist at 1998 Commonwealth Games
 Lewin Nyatanga, football player currently playing for Barnsley Football Club
 Jasvinder Sanghera CBE, author and campaigner
 Lucy Ward, folk musician - winner of the BBC Radio 2 Folk Awards "Horizon Award" in 2012

References

Educational institutions established in 1949
Secondary schools in Derby
1949 establishments in England
Community schools in Derby